Frederick Arthur Stanley, 16th Earl of Derby,  (15 January 1841 – 14 June 1908) styled as Hon. Frederick Stanley from 1844 to 1886 and as The Lord Stanley of Preston between 1886 and 1893, was a Conservative Party politician in the United Kingdom who served as Colonial Secretary from 1885 to 1886 and Governor General of Canada from 1888 to 1893. An avid sportsman, he built Stanley House Stables in England and is famous in North America for presenting Canada with the Stanley Cup. Stanley was also one of the original inductees of the Hockey Hall of Fame.

Background and education
Stanley was the second son of Prime Minister Edward Smith-Stanley, 14th Earl of Derby, and the Hon. Emma Caroline, daughter of Edward Bootle-Wilbraham, 1st Baron Skelmersdale. He was born in London, and educated at Eton and Sandhurst. He received a commission in the Grenadier Guards, rising to the rank of Captain before leaving the army for politics. He later served as Lieutenant-Colonel Commandant of the part-time 1st Royal Lancashire Militia (The Duke of Lancaster's Own) from 23 June 1874 (though his political duties often kept him away from the regiment's annual training) and became Honorary Colonel of its successor, the 3rd and 4th Battalions, King's Own (Royal Lancaster Regiment), from 27 February 1886 until his death.

Political career
As the Hon Frederick Stanley he served as a Conservative Member of Parliament (for Preston from 1865 to 1868, North Lancashire from 1868 to 1885 and Blackpool from 1885 to 1886).  In government, he served as a Civil Lord of the Admiralty (1868), Financial Secretary to the War Office (1874–1878), Secretary to the Treasury (1878), War Secretary (1878–1880) and Colonial Secretary (1885–1886). In 1886, he was created Baron Stanley of Preston, in the County Palatine of Lancaster. He served as President of the Board of Trade (1886–1888), remaining in that office until he was appointed Governor General of Canada.

Derby was a Freemason.

Governor General of Canada

Stanley was appointed the Governor General of Canada and Commander in Chief of Prince Edward Island on 1 May 1888. During his term as Governor General, he travelled often and widely throughout the country. His visit to western Canada in 1889 gave him a lasting appreciation of the region's great natural beauty as well as permitting him to meet the people of Canada's First Nations and many western ranchers and farmers. During his visit, he dedicated Stanley Park, which is named after him. He also experienced the joys of fishing and avidly pursued the sport whenever his busy schedule allowed. As governor general, Stanley was the third holder of that office to whom Queen Victoria granted the power of granting pardons to offenders or remitting sentences and fines and the power of mitigating capital or any other sentence.

When Prime Minister John A. Macdonald died in office of heart failure on 6 June 1891, Stanley lost the close friendship he had enjoyed with Macdonald. He asked John Abbott to take over as prime minister. Once the government was in place, Abbott resigned for health reasons and turned the government over to John Thompson. Stanley helped cement the non-political role of the governor general when, in 1891, he refused to agree to a controversial motion in the House of Commons. The motion called on him as governor general to disallow the government of Quebec's Jesuit Estates Act, which authorized paying $400,000 as compensation for land granted to the Jesuits by the King of France. The opposition to the bill was introduced by the other provinces who were motivated by mistrust of the Roman Catholic Church in Quebec. Stanley declined to interfere, citing the proposed disallowal as unconstitutional. In holding to this decision, he gained popularity by refusing to compromise the viceregal position of political neutrality.

Stanley's wife, whom Wilfrid Laurier described as "an able and witty woman", made a lasting contribution during her husband's term of office. In 1891, she founded the Lady Stanley Institute for Trained Nurses on Rideau Street, the first nursing school in Ottawa. She was also an enthusiastic fan of hockey games at the Rideau Rink.

NHL Stanley Cup

Stanley's sons became avid ice hockey players in Canada, playing in amateur leagues in Ottawa, and Lord and Lady Stanley became staunch hockey fans. In 1892, Stanley gave Canada a treasured national icon, the Stanley Cup, known originally as the Dominion Hockey Challenge Cup. He originally donated the trophy as a challenge cup for Canada's best amateur hockey club, but in 1909, it became contested for by professional teams exclusively. Since 1926, only teams of the National Hockey League have competed for the trophy. This now-famous cup bears Stanley's name as a tribute to his encouragement and love of outdoor life and sport in Canada. In recognition of this, he was inducted into the Canadian Hockey Hall of Fame in 1945 in the "Honoured Builders" category.

Later years

Stanley's term as Governor General of Canada was due to end in September 1893. However, in April of that year, his elder brother, the 15th Earl of Derby, died. Stanley succeeded him as the 16th Earl of Derby. As a result, Stanley, now known as Lord Derby, left Canada on 15 July 1893 and returned to England. An administrator was appointed to fulfil his duties until Lord Aberdeen was sworn in that September.

Also in 1893, Toronto's "New Fort York" (built in 1841) was renamed The Stanley Barracks in honour of Lord Stanley. Back with his family in England, he soon became the Lord Mayor of Liverpool and the first Chancellor of the University of Liverpool. Stanley Park, Liverpool is also named after him. In November 1901 Lord Derby was elected Mayor of Preston for the following year, and took part in the 1902 Preston Guild. He later received the honorary freedom of the borough of Preston, with which his family had been associated  for centuries.

During the last years of his life, he increasingly dedicated himself to philanthropic work. He was founder president of the committee for the building of Liverpool Cathedral in 1901. He helped fund the Coronation Park, Ormskirk, in 1905.

Family

Derby married Lady Constance Villiers, daughter of George Villiers, 4th Earl of Clarendon, on 31 May 1864. She was born in 1840. They had eight sons and two daughters (of whom one son and one daughter died as children). Her Ladyship remained and several of their children lived in Canada throughout his term as Governor-General. She was responsible for the foundation of the Lady Stanley Institute for Trained Nurses in Ottawa, Ontario, as well as a Maternity Hospital. She was president of the $4,000 fund instituted by the women of Canada for the presentation of a wedding gift to the present Prince and Princess of Wales: a sleigh, robes, harnesses and horses and a canoe. In 1890 Prince George of Wales (the future King George V) was their guest at Rideau Hall. In 1903 King Edward VII was their guest at their residence, St. James Square, London, England.

Their 10 children (8 boys; 2 girls) were:
 Edward George Villiers Stanley (1865-1948), who succeeded his father as 17th Earl of Derby.
 Katherine Mary Stanley (circa 1866-21 October 1871).
 Hon. Sir Victor Albert Stanley (1867–1934), was an Admiral in the Royal Navy who married a Canadian lady, the daughter of Hon. C. E. Pooley, KC, of British Columbia. 
 Hon. Sir Arthur Stanley (1869-1947).
 Geoffrey Stanley (18 November 1869 – 16 March 1871).
 Hon. Ferdinand Charles Stanley, was educated at Wellington and Sandhurst, before joining the King's Royal Rifle Corps in 1891, rising to the rank of Brigadier-General. He married the Hon. Alexandra Fellowes, the eldest daughter of William Henry Fellowes, Baron de Ramsey; they lived at 8 Cornwall Terrace, Regent's Park, London, now renamed Stanley House.
 Lt.-Col. Rt. Hon. Sir George Frederick Stanley (1872–1938), Royal Horse Artillery, MP, junior minister and Governor of Madras. Married Lady Beatrix Taylour (died 1944), daughter of Thomas Taylour, 3rd Marquess of Headfort; they had a daughter.
 Hon. Col. Algernon Francis Stanley (1872-1962), married the widow Mary Cavendish Crichton (her late husband Lt-Col. Henry William, son of John Crichton, 4th Earl Erne was KIA in 1914 on the Western Front), daughter of Hugh Grosvenor, 1st Duke of Westminster. They had one son and a daughter.
Lady Isobel Gathorne-Hardy, was their longest-living child, living until 1963. She was instrumental in convincing her father to create the Stanley Cup. She is mentioned in one of the first games of women's hockey, played at Rideau Skating Rink in 1899. Her role as a women's hockey pioneer is recognized in women's hockey with both the Isobel Gathorne-Hardy Award, given across women's hockey in Canada, and the Isobel Cup, the Premier Hockey Federation's championship trophy.
 Lt.-Col. Hon. Frederick William Stanley (1878-1942), married Lady Alexandra Louise Elizabeth Acheson, the daughter of Archibald Acheson, 4th Earl of Gosford and Louisa Acheson, Countess of Gosford on 17 June 1905. They had one son and two daughters, one of whom married the son of Lieutenant-General Sir George Sidney Clive. He would go on to serve and be wounded in the Second Boer War, and later the First World War.

Derby died on 14 June 1908, aged 67, and was succeeded by his eldest son, Edward, who also became a distinguished politician. Lady Derby died on 17 April 1922.

Legacy
After Edward Whymper made the first ascent of Stanley Peak in 1901, he named the mountain after Lord Derby. Vancouver's Stanley Park and Stanley Theatre were also named after him, as was Stanley Park, Blackpool.

The Preston Squadron of cadets at the Royal Military College Saint-Jean was named in his honour. Stanley Park, an area that famously separates Anfield and Goodison Park, the home grounds of English Premier League football teams Liverpool F.C. and Everton F.C., was named after him. Stanley House Inn, named for Lord Stanley and was built as his summer residence in 1888 along the Cascapedia River.

The Dominion Hockey Challenge Cup is today known as the Stanley Cup and is awarded to the winning team of the National Hockey League playoffs each season. In October 2017, Lord Stanley's Gift Monument was erected in Ottawa at Sparks Street and Elgin Street, near the location of the dinner party announcing the Cup at the Russell House, which has since been demolished.

Stanley Quay, later renamed Stanley Street, in Brisbane, Australia, was named after him at the time he was Colonial Secretary.

Honorary degrees
 Queen's University in Kingston, Ontario (LL.D) in 1889

Honorific eponyms
 Stanley, New Brunswick
 Stanley, Nova Scotia
 Port Stanley, Ontario
 Stanley (Oliver Paipoonge), Ontario
 Stanley Park, Vancouver, British Columbia
 Stanley Park, Liverpool, UK
 Stanley Peak (Ball Range) (British Columbia)
 Rue Stanley, Montréal, Québec
 Stanley Avenue, Victoria, British Columbia
 Stanley Street, Brisbane, Queensland
 Stanley Street, Townsville, Queensland
 Stanley, Hong Kong

Arms

See also
List of statues and sculptures in Liverpool
List of attractions and monuments in Stanley Park

Notes

References
 Burke's Peerage, Baronetage and Knightage, 100th Edn, London, 1953.
 
 Maj R.J.T. Williamson & Col J. Lawson Whalley, History of the Old County Regiment of Lancashire Militia, London: Simpkin, Marshall, 1888.

External links

 
 Website of the Governor General of Canada
 
Lord Stanley's Glacier hike
 Photograph: Lord Stanley in 1889. McCord Museum
 Photograph: Lord Stanley in 1889. McCord Museum
 Photograph: His Excellency Lord Stanley and snowshoes in 1890. McCord Museum

Governors General of Canada
British Secretaries of State
Graduates of the Royal Military College, Sandhurst
Lords of the Admiralty
Stanley, Frederick
Stanley, Frederick
Stanley, Frederick
Stanley, Frederick
Stanley, Frederick
Stanley, Frederick
Derby, E16
UK MPs who were granted peerages
Members of the Privy Council of the United Kingdom
Grenadier Guards officers
Lancashire Militia officers
Stanley Cup
Hockey Hall of Fame inductees
British racehorse owners and breeders
Lord-Lieutenants of Lancashire
Children of prime ministers of the United Kingdom
Knights of the Garter
Knights Grand Cross of the Order of the Bath
Knights Grand Cross of the Royal Victorian Order
1841 births
1908 deaths
Frederick
Mayors of Liverpool
16
Secretaries of State for the Colonies
Presidents of the Board of Trade
Canadian Freemasons
Peers of the United Kingdom created by Queen Victoria
Historic Society of Lancashire and Cheshire
Mayors of Preston, Lancashire
People educated at Eton College